Josep Oriol Alsina García (born 21 August 1967) is a Spanish football manager and former player who manages UE Costa Brava.

Playing career
Born in Arenys de Mar, Barcelona, Catalonia, Alsina only played regional football during his entire career, representing CF Arenys de Mar, UE Rubí, UE Vilassar de Mar, CF Vidreres, CF Sils, Arbúcies CF and UE Llagostera. He retired with the latter in 1996 at the age of 29, due to a knee injury.

Managerial career
Alsina was appointed manager of his last club Llagostera in 1997, with the club in the ninth division. After two years at UD Cassà's reserves, he returned to the Blanquivermells in 2004.

Alsina was the manager during the club's impressive run, which consisted of six promotions in eight seasons. On 5 February 2013, he was replaced by Lluís Carrillo, after lacking the license to coach in Segunda División B, and was immediately named assistant and director of football.

On 6 June 2014, Alsina moved to neighbouring Girona FC along with Óscar Álvarez and Carrillo, after agreeing to a three-year deal. On 1 July, however, he left the club and subsequently returned to Llagostera.

On 21 October Carrillo and Alsina were named managers, after the dismissal of Santi Castillejo. After again not having the license, he was appointed assistant.

On 28 July 2015, Alsina was finally appointed at the helm of the main squad in Segunda División, after acquiring the license needed. His first professional match in charge occurred on 22 August, a 2–0 home loss against CA Osasuna, and he remained in charge for the remainder of the campaign, which ended in relegation.

On 10 May 2017, Alsina announced that he would be stepping down from his manager role. On 8 July of the following year, after the club suffered another drop, he was again appointed manager.

References

External links

Galería del Fútbol Català profile 
Soccerway profile

1967 births
Living people
People from Maresme
Sportspeople from the Province of Barcelona
Spanish footballers
Footballers from Catalonia
Tercera División players
UE Rubí players
CF Balaguer footballers
UE Costa Brava players
Spanish football managers
Segunda División managers
Primera Federación managers
Segunda División B managers
Tercera División managers
UE Costa Brava managers
Association footballers not categorized by position
UE Vilassar de Mar players